Camille de Rocca Serra (born 21 May 1954 in Porto-Vecchio) was the president of the regional council of Corsica between 2004 and 2010. He was a member of the Union for a Popular Movement (UMP).

He was also the UMP deputy for Corse-du-Sud's 2nd constituency in the national assembly of France from 2002 to 2017.  At the 2007 election, he  was re-elected with 51.02% in the first round.

References 

1954 births
Living people
People from Porto-Vecchio
Corsican politicians
Union for a Popular Movement politicians
The Strong Right
Members of the Corsican Assembly
Deputies of the 12th National Assembly of the French Fifth Republic
Deputies of the 13th National Assembly of the French Fifth Republic
Deputies of the 14th National Assembly of the French Fifth Republic